Li Rong (fl. 658–663) was a Chinese philosopher from the Tang dynasty. 
He compiled a commentary on the Taoist book Tao Te Ching, called the Laozi Commentary by Li Rong.

References 
 

Tang dynasty Taoists
Year of death unknown
Year of birth unknown